Antilles may refer to:

Places
 Antilles, a group of islands in the Caribbean Sea
Greater Antilles
Lesser Antilles
Leeward Antilles
Netherlands Antilles

Arts and media
 Antilles Records, an American record label
 Radio Antilles, a radio station founded in 1963, that was located on the island of Montserrat
 Three unrelated characters in the Star Wars universe:
 Wedge Antilles, a Rebel pilot in the Star Wars universe
 Raymus Antilles, a Rebel captain in Star Wars: Episode IV – A New Hope
 Bail Antilles, a senator mentioned in Star Wars: Episode I - The Phantom Menace

Other uses
 Antilles Current, a warm water current
 Antilles War, a war between the United Kingdom and the Kingdom of France during 1782
 SS Antilles, a French ocean liner built in 1952 and wrecked in 1971
 SS Antilles, an American passenger-cargo ship built in 1907 and sunk by a U-boat in 1917
 Radeon HD 6990 GPU, codenamed Antilles; see Radeon HD 6000 Series

See also
Several species are named for the Antilles:
 Antilles catshark (Galeus antillensis), a cartilaginous fish
 Antilles monkey, a tribe of extinct primates
 Antilles racer (Alsophis antillensis), a species of snake 
 Antilles pinktoe (Avicularia versicolor), a species of spider